Randall Paul Henderson Jr. (born August 3, 1956) is an American real estate broker and politician who was Mayor of the City of Fort Myers, Florida from 2009 to 2020.

Early years
Randy was born and raised in North Carolina. He graduated from Asheboro High School in 1975, playing football, baseball, and basketball. He was named most outstanding football player in 1974 (known as Mr. Blue Comet), and his 1975 baseball team won the WNCHSAA state championship. He would later be inducted in the Asheboro High School hall of fame in 2011.
   
Randy attended Mars Hill College with an athletic scholarship, where he played football and was a four-year letterman for the baseball team. He graduated in 1979 with a BS in business administration.

Business career
Randy's career in Fort Myers began in banking where he worked his way up to vice-president.  He left banking in 1986 and assumed operating responsibilities for Corbin Henderson Company, a real estate firm, as president.

Mayor of Fort Myers 
Henderson was elected Mayor of Fort Myers in 2009, and reelected in 2013 and 2017.

In November 2020, Henderson resigned as mayor to run in that year's election to represent Florida's 19th congressional district. He was defeated in the Republican primary for the seat, finishing fifth.

Community affairs

Randy has been involved in community affairs for years serving on the following boards:

Current affiliations

Former Service

Personal life
Randy met Virginia Ann Corbin, daughter of former Fort Myers mayor Oscar Corbin Jr., at Mars Hill College. They were married at the First United Methodist Church in Fort Myers and have three children, Laura, Marcus, and Alex.

Randy Henderson is a private pilot and enjoys flying both for business and personal pleasure.  He enjoys time with family and is an avid fisherman.

Electoral History

Fort Myers Mayor Elections

2009

2013

2017

U.S. House of Representatives Elections

2020

See also 
 List of Mayors of Fort Myers, Florida

References

External links
 , Corbin Henderson Investment Realty Website

Living people
1956 births
Mayors of places in Florida
People from Fort Myers, Florida
People from Asheboro, North Carolina
American real estate businesspeople
Florida Republicans
Candidates in the 2020 United States elections